Naish is a surname. Notable people with the surname include:

John Naish (shipbuilder) (died 1726), English shipbuilder to the Royal Navy
William Naish (artist) (1766/7–1800), English miniature painter
William Naish (Quaker) (1785–1860), English Quaker writer and abolitionist
John Naish (1841–1890), Irish lawyer and judge, Lord Chancellor of Ireland
J. Carrol Naish (1897–1973), American actor
Darren Naish, British palaeontologist and science writer
Robby Naish windsurfer and kitesurfer, also Naish kites, sails and boards

See also
Naish District, Afghanistan
Naish languages, a lower-level language subgroup within the Sino-Tibetan family of languages